Meninsky is a surname. Notable people with the surname include: 

Bernard Meninsky (1891–1950), British artist
Carla Meninsky, American video game designer and programmer
Philip Meninsky (1919–2007), British artist, son of Bernard